The name Karding has been used for three tropical cyclones in the Philippines by PAGASA in the Western Pacific Ocean.

 Tropical Depression 14W (2014) (14W, Karding) – short-lived tropical depression which clipped Hainan towards the end of its life.
 Tropical Storm Yagi (2018) (T1814, 18W, Karding) – a tropical storm which affected the Philippines and East China.
 Typhoon Noru (2022) (T2216, 18W, Karding) – a Category 5-equivalent typhoon that impacted the Philippines, Vietnam, Cambodia and Thailand.

Pacific typhoon set index articles